Neargyractis plusialis is a moth in the family Crambidae. It was described by Gottlieb August Wilhelm Herrich-Schäffer in 1871. It is found on Cuba and Puerto Rico.

References

Acentropinae
Moths described in 1871